Frank Stanley may refer to:

Frank C. Stanley (1868–1910), bass-baritone vocalist
Frank Stanley (cinematographer) (1922–1999), American cinematographer
Frank L. Stanley Sr. (1906–1974), publisher of Louisville Defender newspaper, political activist, civil rights advocate, drafted the 1950 legislation that led to integration of Kentucky's public universities.
Frank L. Stanley Jr. (1937–2007), civil rights leader in Louisville, Kentucky, involved in efforts towards desegregation of public accommodations and the 1964 March on Frankfort which drew 10,000 activists.